The conflict in Konso is part of a series of ethnic-based violence in Ethiopia. UN OCHA reported that its Early warning department of SNNPR categorized Konso as a priority hot spot area. Repeated conflict and the issue of adverse weather exacerbated the existing humanitarian crisis in the Zone. Interpersonal ethnic violence are deepening into series human rights violations and suffering, with the ethnic federalism system that drew formal administrative divisions with regional boundaries falling along ethnic lines.

Background and events of the Konso conflict 
This is the background for some southern ethnic habitation since the 1990s and the timeline of the Konso conflict.

References

See also 
 Human rights in Ethiopia
 Ethnic violence against Amaro Koore
 Democratic backsliding in Ethiopia
 Gambela massacre

Ethiopian civil conflict (2018–present)
Ethnicity-based civil wars
1990s in Ethiopia
2000s in Ethiopia
2010s in Ethiopia
2020s in Ethiopia